The National Organization of Free Unions of Guinea (ONSLG) is a national trade union center in Guinea. It is affiliated with the International Trade Union Confederation.

References

Trade unions in Guinea
International Trade Union Confederation